Plag, PLAG, or plag may refer to:

 PLAG1, a protein
 Plagiarism, the wrongful appropriation of another author's work
 PlagTracker, a plagiarism detection software
 PlagScan, a plagiarism detection software
 VroniPlag Wiki, a wiki on plagiarism in German doctoral theses
 Plagioclase, a solid solution series of minerals in the feldspar group